Bobby & Co. was a provincial department store group based mainly in seaside towns on the south coast of England. The business operated from 1887 until 1972.

History

Early history 
In 1887, Frederick James Bobby (1860-1941) bought an established drapery store in Margate, Kent, located on the corner of High Street and Queen Street. The business grew to incorporate several neighbouring premises. In 1900, the business was incorporated and an expansion programme was begun, opening stores in specially selected towns, mostly seaside resorts. Stores were opened in Leamington Spa (1905), Folkestone (formerly C J Saunders; purchased 1906), Eastbourne (formerly Atkinson & Co., trading as Strange & Atkinson; purchased 1910), Torquay (formerly Robert Thomas Knight; expanded 1921 with the purchase of Iredales), Cliftonville, Bournemouth (opened 1915 on the site of Hugh King; later extended) Exeter (formerly Green & Son, acquired 1922) and Southport.

In the 1920s the business employed the artist F Gregory Brown to design a number of advertisement posters, which were printed by Bobby's own print shop and displayed in railway stations. Brown was also employed, at the same time, by Kensington department store Derry & Toms.

1927-1972 
Frederick Bobby retired from the business in 1927, selling his shares to a recently formed retail conglomerate, the Drapery Trust. The Bobby & Co. group was run as a separate entity within the trust, chaired by Frederick Bobby's son. The company was funded to further expand, incorporating the Bristol department store of John Cordeux & Son (renamed Bobby & Co.) in 1928. The Margate store was refurbished in 1937. By this time the Bobby & Co. subsidiary had expanded to include Dusts of Tunbridge Wells, Handleys of Southsea, Haymans of Totnes, Hills of Hove, Hubbards of  Worthing, Simes of Worcester, Taylors of Bristol and Wellsteeds of Reading.

In the early 1970s the decision was taken by the Debenhams board to rationalise the entire group and bring the majority of their department stores under the Debenhams brand. The stores in Margate and Cliftonville were closed in 1972, while all other stores trading under the Bobby's name were rebranded as Debenhams.

2021-present 
In September 2021, the former store in Bournemouth was reopened, after the collapse of Debenhams, under the Bobby's/Bobby & Co. name as an independent concept department store hosting local independent retailers.

References 

Retail companies established in 1887
Debenhams
Defunct department stores of the United Kingdom
Defunct retail companies of the United Kingdom
Margate
1887 establishments in England
Retail companies disestablished in 1972
1972 disestablishments in England